Salipaludibacillus neizhouensis is a Gram-positive, facultatively alkaliphilic, slightly halophilic, endospore-forming, rod-shaped, aerobic and non-motil bacterium from the genus of Salipaludibacillus which has been isolated from a sea anemone from Neizhou Bay from the South China Sea.

References

External links
Type strain of Salipaludibacillus neizhouensis at BacDive -  the Bacterial Diversity Metadatabase

 

Bacillaceae
Bacteria described in 2009